Chen Ti and Peng Hsien-yin are the defending champions, but only Chen defended his title partnering Huang Liang-chi.

Seeds

Draw

References
 Main Draw

ATP Challenger China International - Nanchang - Doubles
2015 Doubles